Quiana Lynell is an American blues and jazz singer, arranger and songwriter.

Early life 
Lynell was born in Tyler, Texas. She grew up in a religious home and was exposed to gospel music from a young age. During high school she was in the all-state choir.

Education 
Lynell moved to Baton Rouge for her education. Lynell earned a B.A. degree on Vocal Performance from Louisiana State University on a scholarship.

Career
Lynell began her singing career as a classical singer and was a member of the St. James Episcopal Church choir in Baton Rouge. After meeting Janelle Brown, lead singer of the zydeco group 2 Da T, she began exploring additional musical genres, including zydeco and R&B. She has been mentored by notable artists such as Aaron Neville, Germaine Bazzle, and Wendell Brunious.

In 2017 she won the Sarah Vaughan International Jazz Vocal Competition and as a result of the award she received a recording contract with Concord Records.

Lynell has performed with Nona Hendryx, Terence Blanchard, Jon Cowherd, Marvin Sewell, Eric Harland, Herbie Hancock, Patti Austin, Bilal, Ledisi, and with local artists and bands in Louisiana. She regularly performs at venues in New Orleans and Baton Rouge, including at the New Orleans Jazz and Heritage Festival on multiple occasions. She has also performed with the Baton Rouge Symphony Orchestra as a principle Soprano In 2017, with the Preservation Hall Jazz Band, Lynell performed a tribute concert to Ella Fitzgerald, celebrating her 100th birthday.  In 2018, Lynell was a featured artist with Bernard Purdie's All-Star Shuffle, and Bobbi Humphrey, at Brooklyn Academy of Music's R&B Festival in Brooklyn.

In 2016, Lynell released the EP Loving Me (Q Sound) and the single Baton Rouge (Q Sound). Lynell has been a featured soloist on studio albums.

Lynell has developed the educational program, "Made in America: Lyrically Speaking: Breaking Down Jazz, Blues and Soul in American Music, from the Vocalist Perspective", which has been used in clinics across the United States to educated students on jazz, blues and traditional American music from the vocalist perspective. She is also the founder of the running club, Musicians Run, aimed at promoted running to local musicians in Baton Rouge.

Lynell has held several teaching positions, including as band directors in elementary and middle schools. Since 2016 she has been a private vocal instructor and an adjunct professor at Loyola University New Orleans, Louisiana.

Awards 

 2017: Winner of Sarah Vaughan International Jazz Vocal Competition
 2017: Nominee for Best Emerging Artist, Best of the Beat Awards

Personal life 
Lynell has two children and lives in Baton Rouge.

External links
 Official website
Fox Performances 
 The Jazz of Entrepreneurs | Quiana Lynell | TEDxLSU 
 Quiana Lynell - The 504 TV Show Interview

References

Living people
American blues singers
American women jazz singers
20th-century African-American women singers
American jazz singers
American rhythm and blues singers
Louisiana State University alumni
People from Baton Rouge, Louisiana
Loyola University New Orleans faculty
People from Tyler, Texas
Jazz musicians from Louisiana
Jazz musicians from Texas
1981 births
Concord Records artists
American women academics
21st-century African-American people
21st-century African-American women